Arshaq-e Sharqi Rural District is in the Central District of Ardabil County, Ardabil province, Iran. At the census of 2006, its population was 5,856 in 1,164 households; there were 4,400 inhabitants in 1,144 households at the following census of 2011; and in the most recent census of 2016, it had decreased to 3,403 in 970 households. The largest of its 28 villages was Taleb Qeshlaqi, with 1,409 people.

References 

Ardabil County

Rural Districts of Ardabil Province

Populated places in Ardabil Province

Populated places in Ardabil County